Borderland is the debut studio album by English alternative band The Chevin, released on 25 September 2012.

Track listing
All songs written by Coyle Girelli, except where noted.

Personnel

The Chevin
Coyle Girelli - vocals, guitar, keyboards, organ, piano, programming, string arrangement
Jon Langford - bass
Mat Steel - guitar, keyboards, mandolin, organ
Mal Taylor - drums, percussion

Additional personnel
Anna Bulbrook - violin
Manuel Calderock - engineering
Cesar Camarena - cello
Vanessa Cedillos - violin
Mark Heaton - guitar, piano
Noah Shain - producer, mixer, engineering

References

The Chevin (band) albums
2012 albums